Christopher Hayes (September 1931 - March 1990) was an Irish hurler who played as a centre-back for club side New Ireland and at inter-county level with the Dublin senior hurling team.

Honours

Dublin
Leinster Senior Hurling Championship (1): 1961

References

1931 births
1990 deaths
Dublin inter-county hurlers
Place of birth missing